Remix Magazine is a quarterly fashion magazine established in November 1997 in New Zealand and now distributed around the world.
The content is predominantly fashion, beauty, pop culture and entertainment conveyed through original editorial and photography.

Published independently by Remix Media Ltd, Remix magazine has two titles; A New Zealand edition released throughout Australasia quarterly and an international edition released throughout the United States and Europe twice yearly. Founder and owner Tim Phin remains the publisher. The current editor is Amber Baker.

References

External links
Official website

1997 establishments in New Zealand
Fashion magazines
Magazines established in 1997
Magazines published in New Zealand
Mass media in Auckland
Quarterly magazines